Tomashka is a rural locality (a settlement) in Semigorodneye Rural Settlement, Kharovsky District, Vologda Oblast, Russia. The population was 171 as of 2002. There are 6 streets.

Geography 
Tomashka is located 91 km southeast of Kharovsk (the district's administrative centre) by road. 17 km is the nearest rural locality.

References 

Rural localities in Kharovsky District